The Artist Is Present may refer to:

 The Artist Is Present, a book and a recurring series of art installations by Regina Frank
 The Artist Is Present, a performance art piece by Marina Abramović